The Great War in England in 1897 was written by William Le Queux and published in 1894.

Le Queux's work is an early example of Invasion literature genre, which began with The Battle of Dorking in 1871, where the British are soundly defeated by an invading German army. The Battle of Dorking was written by army veteran George Tomkyns Chesney, originally as a warning against the further demobilisation of the British armed forces.

It was first serialised in the weekly paper Answers. It was a huge success, and after being published as a book, it went through eight editions.

Plot 

Le Queux's novel depicts Britain being invaded by coalition forces led by France and Russia, who make several early advances, but the brave English patriots fight on and eventually manage to turn the tide, especially after Germany enters the war on the side of the British.

By the end of the story, the invasion goes the other way as the victors divide the spoils: Britain seizes Algeria and Russian Central Asia, thus decisively winning The Great Game, and Germany annexes more of mainland France in addition to Alsace-Lorraine, thus leaving the enemies crushed and both the British and German empires the dominant forces of Europe.

Historical approach 

From a historical perspective, the book is interesting in depicting the precise reverse of the alliances of the actual World War I which broke out two decades after its publication: France and Russia, which were to become Britain's World War I allies, are depicted as its implacable cruel foes, while Imperial Germany is the gallant ally coming to Britain's aid at the nick of time.

As evidenced by the book's great popularity, the scenario of such an alliance seemed plausible to the British public in 1894; only four years later, Britain and France were indeed on the verge of war during the Fashoda Incident.

The fate of the story's treacherous villain who, with all his plots unmasked flees to Spain and there meets an ignominious end, might have been inspired by the fate of Richard Pigott. The author of the "Pigott forgeries" had in 1889 tried to defame Charles Stewart Parnell, and after his plot was discovered, fled to Madrid and there killed himself. At the time of writing, this was a recent and well-known scandal.

The Entente Cordiale of 1904 changed the diplomatic and military landscape, which was reflected in fictional writings. Thus, in 1906, Le Queux wrote The Invasion of 1910, which featured Germany invading and occupying Britain and stressed the need to prepare for war with Germany.

Influences on other works 

The Great War in England is considered to have influenced, directly and indirectly, many subsequent works. Specifically, H. G. Wells' The War of the Worlds. In Wells' book, as in Le Queux's, a relentless enemy makes a devastating surprise attack and penetrates to the heart of London. In many ways, however, Wells' book seems a deliberate antithesis to Le Queux's nationalism: in the Wells book, the attack is extraterrestrial with the invading Martians posing a deadly threat to all humanity equally; human weapons are futile against the invaders, who are overcome only by earthly microbes; and in the aftermath, the nations of chastened humanity are drawn together.

Anthologies
Before Armageddon: An Anthology of Victorian and Edwardian Imaginative Fiction Published Before 1914  (1976)

References

See also
The Invasion of 1910
Invasion literature

External links
William Le Queux (1894). The Great War in England in 1897. From Internet Archive.

1894 British novels
Invasion literature
British science fiction novels
Fictional invasions of England
Fiction set in 1897